The 2009 Red Bull Air Race World Championship was the seventh official Red Bull Air Race World Championship series. The 2009 champion was Paul Bonhomme, who won the series for the first time.

Aircraft and pilots

New pilots 
Four new pilots joined the Red Bull Air Race Series for the 2009 season as Steve Jones left the series. They were Matthias Dolderer from Germany, Matt Hall from Australia, Yoshihide Muroya from Japan and Pete McLeod from Canada. McLeod was the youngest pilot in the history of the series, joining at 25 years of age.

Race calendar and results

Championship standings 

(*) indicates the pilot received an extra point for the fastest time in Qualifying

References

External links 
 Red Bull Air Race official website
 Unofficial Air Race website
 Smoke-On.com A Red Bull Air Race Fan Site
 Bleacher Report's Red Bull Air Race Page

Red Bull Air Race World Championship seasons
Red Bull Air Race
Red Bull Air Race